Here's Your Hat What's Your Hurry is a collection of short stories by Elizabeth McCracken first published in 1993 by Random House. It was included on the American Library Association's "List of Notable Books for 1994."

Stories
 It's Bad Luck to Die
 Some Have Entertained Angels, Unaware
 Here's Your Hat What's Your Hurry
 The Bar of Our Recent Unhappiness
 Mercedes Kane
 What We Know About the Lost Aztec Children
 June
 Secretary of State
 The Goings-On of the World

References

1993 short story collections
American short story collections
English-language novels